Founded in 1909, Montebello High School is a public high school which is part of the Montebello Unified School District, and has an enrollment of approximately 2,600 students in grades 9-12. Its campus is located in Montebello, California, a suburb of Los Angeles. It is named for the city of Montebello.

Overview

The Montebello High School mascot is known as Ollie the Oiler, and the school's students and alumni are referred to as Oilers.

Demographics
The demographic breakdown of the 3,191 students enrolled for the 2012-2013 school year was:
Male - 50.7%
Female - 49.3%
Native American/Alaskan - 0.1%
Asian/Pacific islander - 0.9%
Black - 0.3%
Hispanic - 96.1%
White - 2.4%
Multiracial - 0.2%
Additionally, 86.3% of the students were eligible for free or reduced lunch.

Academics

The school currently offers 2 Pathways.  
The first of the two is the CATS Pathway, which teaches students how to be creative media artists and animators. 
The second of the two is the DRIVEN Pathway, which focuses on students learning about ergo alternative fuels and the automotive industry for future green jobs.

Extracurricular activities

Athletics
The varsity sports teams are referred to as the "Montebello Oilers." The school colors are blue and gold. The school has an athletic rivalry with nearby Schurr High School.

Sports offered at MHS:

Fall sports
 Boys Water Polo
 Competitive Cheer 
 Cross Country
 Football
 Girls Tennis
 Girls Volleyball

Winter sports
 Boys Basketball
 Boys Soccer
 Coed Wrestling 
 Competitive Cheer
 Girls Basketball
 Girls Soccer 
 Girls Water Polo

Spring sports
 Baseball
 Boys Tennis
 Boys Volleyball
 Competitive Cheer
 Golf
 Softball
 Swimming
 Track and Field
 Ice hockey

Notable alumni

Government and politics
David L. Snowden, 1961: Police Chief of City of Beverly Hills, California (2004-2015) 
Art Torres, 1964: former United States Democratic Party state senator

Arts, sciences, and education 
John DeCuir, 1936: art director and production designer
Robert Bruce Merrifield, 1939: biochemist who won the Nobel Prize in Chemistry in 1984 for the invention of solid phase Peptide synthesis

Sports and entertainment
Jack Kramer, 1939: tennis player in International Tennis Hall of Fame
Tom Tellez, 1951: former track coach at the University of Houston in Texas
Darlene Hard, 1954: tennis player in International Tennis Hall of Fame
Jesse Gonzalez, 2015: professional photographer in Los Angeles
Barney Rosenzweig, 1955: television producer
Jerry Pimm, 1956: former basketball coach at University of Utah
Bobby Knoop, 1956: retired MLB second baseman for California Angels, Chicago White Sox, and Kansas City Royals
Edward James Olmos, 1964: actor and director
John Madrid, 1966: jazz and pop music trumpeter

References

External links
 Montebello High School

Educational institutions established in 1909
High schools in Los Angeles County, California
Public high schools in California
Montebello, California
1909 establishments in California